Rawat Tana (born 5 May 1977) is a wheelchair racer from Thailand who is a gold medalist at both the Summer Paralympic and World Championships.

At the 2004 Olympic Games, he finished 3rd in the demonstration sport of Men's 1500m wheelchair. In same event at the 2004 Summer Paralympics, he did not qualify for the final, after getting into a collision with Robert Figl in the semifinals. He did, however, win a bronze in the 10,000 metres, a gold in the 4×100 metre relay, and another gold in the 4×400 metre relay at those same Paralympic games.

References

1977 births
Living people
Rawat Tana
Wheelchair racers at the 2004 Summer Olympics
Rawat Tana
Athletes (track and field) at the 2004 Summer Paralympics
Athletes (track and field) at the 2016 Summer Paralympics
Rawat Tana
Rawat Tana
Rawat Tana
Male wheelchair racers
Paralympic wheelchair racers
Medalists at the 2004 Summer Paralympics
Medalists at the 2016 Summer Paralympics
Paralympic medalists in athletics (track and field)
Rawat Tana